Dantewada (also known as Dantewara) is a town and a municipality, or nagar palika. in the Dantewada district in the state of Chhattisgarh, India.It is the administrative headquarters of Dantewada District. It is the fourth largest city of Bastar division. The town is named after the goddess Danteshwari, the presiding deity of the Danteshwari Temple located in the town, 80 km from the Jagdalpur town. The goddess is worshipped as an incarnation of Shakti and the temple is held to be one of the fifty-two sacred Shakti Peethas. Dantewada Town is well connected by broad gauge railway line from Visakhapatnam. The Nearest Big city to Dantewada is Raipur and well connected with Bus services

Geography
It has an average elevation of 351 meters (1154 feet). Dantewada city is situated on the river banks of Shakini and Dakini rivers.

Places of interest

Danteshwari temple 
One of the Shaktipeethas of India, Maa Danteshwari temple is in Dantewada. The presiding deity of Dantewada is goddess Danteshwari. World-famous Bastar Dussehra which is also the longest festival of world, starts from Dantewada Shaktipeeth.

Dholkal Ganesha 
Ganesha idol at a height of 3000 feet is amidst the lush green forests of Bailadila ranges. Path to the peak is full of beautiful sightings. Tourists are visiting Dholkal for real adventure.

Phoolpad waterfalls 
Phoolpad waterfall is a waterfall with scenic ambience. Recently, District Administration Dantewada started river rappelling to boost tourism in the area.

Barsoor 
Known as "the city of temples and lakes", Barsoor has a great historical significance. Grandeur architecture of the temples speak out the glorious history of Barsoor. Twin Ganesha idol, Mama Bhancha temple, Chandraditya temple and Battisha temple are some of them.

Saathdhara waterfalls 
6 kilometers from Barsoor, there is a bridge which connects Abujhmarh with Barsoor. The bridge is on Indravati river and before it, there is a trek of around two kilometers to reach the waterfall. Indravati river streams are separated by seven sub-streams and flows through rocky terrain and forms Saathdhara waterfall.

Administrative divisions
Dantewada Tehsil is divided into thirty eight gram panchayats, each one of which has jurisdiction over one or more villages.

Demographics
 India census, Dantewada had a population of 13,633. Males constituted 53% of the population and females 47%. Dantewada had an average literacy rate of 70%, higher than the national average of 59.5%: male literacy was 78% and, female literacy was 61%. In 2001 in Dantewada, 14% of the population was under 6 years of

Educational institutes

1- Government Danteshwari PG College Dantewada http://www.pgcollegedantewada.com

2. College of Agriculture, Chitalanka, Dantewada

3. Kendriya Vidyalaya, Chitalanka, Dantewada http://www.kvdantewada.com/home.php

4. Jawahar Navodaya Vidyalaya, Barsoor, Dantewada http://www.jnvbarsoor.in

5. Govt Model Higher Secondary School, Dantewada

6. NMDC Polytechnic College Dantewada http://nmdcdavpoly.in

Notable person

Mahendra Karma was a politician of Indian National Congress who was assassinated by Maoists in 2013.

References

Cities and towns in Dantewada district